Probable G-protein coupled receptor 27 is a protein that in humans is encoded by the GPR27 gene.

See also
 SREB

References

G protein-coupled receptors